Hocuspocus is a 1953 West German comedy crime film directed by Kurt Hoffmann and starring Curt Goetz, Valerie von Martens (his wife) and Hans Nielsen. Based on Goetz's own play from 1926 and on the first movie of 1930 of which an English-language version was made at the same time, it was remade in 1966 in color as Hocuspocus.

It was shot at Göttingen Studios. The film's sets were designed by the art director's Kurt Herlth and Hermann Warm.

Plot 

After the unsuccessful painter Hilmar Kjerulf has supposedly died, interest in his paintings rises significantly. One of his worshippers is the President of the criminal court, who has to trial over his soft-spoken widow Agda Kjerulf. She is accused of having drowned her husband in a lake and simply defends herself by remaining silent or theatrically dropping unconscious. A mysterious person warns the court president several times that somebody wants to kill him on a certain date, and the supposed victim calls for his friend and lawyer, Mr. Graham, to come for support. The mysterious visitor shows up, revealing his identity as Peer Bille, son of a famous circus artist and manager, and demonstrates some false evidences pointing to Mr. Graham plotting to kill his friend. He reveals that proof to be sleight of hand "hocuspocus" and insists the court president to treat evidence, especially evidence concerning his recent courtcase, as critic as possible. The next day in court the President learns, that attourney Peer Bille has taken over the defence of Mrs. Kjerulf because her lawyer has stepped down. Bille and the state attorney try to reconstruct the last day of the late painter. Bille can make some points but confusion rises, when witness Kiebutz testifies that Mrs. Kjerulf has received conjugational visit from a man right after the supposed death of Mr. Kjerulf. Eventually Mr. Graham is allowed to investigate and succeeds in proving Peer Bille to be much more than a counsellor for Mrs. Kjerulf. As tides turn against Bille, he and his accomplice reveal the whole plot and the real reason, how and why painter Hilmar Kjerulf died but actually has not died at all.

Cast 
Curt Goetz as Peer Bille
Valerie von Martens as Agda Kjerulf
Hans Nielsen as court president
Ernst Waldow as prosecutor
Erich Ponto as Mr. Arthur Graham
Elisabeth Flickenschildt as witness Kiebutz
Joachim Teege as witness Eunano
Margrit Ensinger
Mila Kopp
Fritz Rasp as attendant
Tilo von Berlepsch
Fritz Brandt

References

Bibliography
 Thomas Elsaesser & Michael Wedel. The BFI companion to German cinema. British Film Institute, 1999.

External links 

at filmportal.de

1953 films
1950s crime comedy films
German crime comedy films
West German films
1950s German-language films
German black-and-white films
German films based on plays
Films based on works by Curt Goetz
Remakes of German films
German courtroom films
Films about fictional painters
1953 comedy films
1950s German films
Films shot at Göttingen Studios